Garbeta Assembly constituency is an assembly constituency in Paschim Medinipur district in the Indian state of West Bengal.

Overview
As per orders of the Delimitation Commission, No. 233 Garbeta Assembly constituency  is composed of the following: Garhbeta I community development block, and Amlasuli, Jogardanga, Piyasala and Sarboth gram panchayats of Garhbeta II community development block.

Garbeta Assembly constituency is part of No. 33 Jhargram (Lok Sabha constituency) (ST).

Election Results

Assembly election 2021
In the 2021 elections, Uttara Singha (Hazra) of AITC defeated her nearest rival, Madan Ruidas of BJP.

Assembly election 2016
In the 2016 elections, Asish Chakraborty of All India Trinamool Congress defeated his nearest rival Sorforoj Khan of CPI(M)

  

.# Swing calculated on LF+Congress vote percentages taken together in 2016.

Assembly election 2011
In the 2011 elections, Sushanta Ghosh of CPI(M) defeated his nearest rival Hema Choubey of Congress.

  

.# Swing calculated on Congress+Trinamool Congress vote percentages taken together in 2006.
Between 1967 and 2006 Garbeta had two seats – Garbeta East and Garbeta West.

1977-2006 Garbeta East
In the 2006, 2001, 1996, 1991 and 1987 state assembly elections, Susanta Ghosh of CPI(M) won the 220 Garbeta East assembly seat, defeating his nearest rivals, Md. Rafique of Trinamool Congress in 2006 and 2001, Tapan Chakraborty of Congress in 1996 and 1991, and Pronab Roy of Congress in 1987. Contests in most years were multi cornered but only winners and runners are being mentioned. Suvendu Mandal of CPI(M) defeated Sarat Kumar Roy of Congress in 1982 and Panchanan Sinha Roy of Janata Party in 1977.

1977-2006 Garbeta West
In 2006, 2001, 1996, 1991 and 1987 state assembly elections, Krishna Prasad Duley of CPI(M) won the 221 Garbeta West (SC) assembly seat defeating Tapas Saha of BJP in 2006, Kalipada Duley of BJP in 2001, Siddhartha Bisai of Congress in 1996, and Kinkar Ruidas of Congress in 1991 and 1987. Contests in most years were multi cornered but only winners and runners are being mentioned. Anadi Malla of CPI(M) defeated Madan Mohan Guria of Congress in 1982. Santosh Bisui of CPI(M) defeated Krishna Prasad Duley of CPI in 1977.

1967-1972 Garbeta East
Krishna Prasad Duley of CPI won in 1972, 1971 and 1969. K.K.Chalak of Congress won in 1967.

1967-1972 Garbeta West
Saroj Roy of CPI won in 1972, 1971 and 1969. P.Sinha Roy of Congress won in 1967.

1951-1962
Tushar Tudu of Congress won in 1962. Tushar Tudu of Congress and Saroj Roy of CPI won the Garbeta dual seat in 1957. Saroj Roy of CPI won the Garbeta seat in independent India's first election in 1951.

References

Assembly constituencies of West Bengal
Politics of Paschim Medinipur district